was a Japanese writer of short stories, novels and poetry. She was awarded the Noma Children's Literature Newcomer Award, the Akutagawa Prize, and the Women's Literature Prize.

Biography
Yoshiyuki was born in Tokyo as the third child of writer Eisuke Yoshiyuki and his wife Aguri, a prominent beautician. She graduated from the department of Japanese literature at Waseda University in 1961.

Her first poetry collection titled  was published in 1963. Her 1967 poetry collection  won her the Tamura Toshiko Prize. In 1973, she published her short story  about her father, who had died when she was only one year old. A collection of short stories titled  followed in 1975. 

Her children's story  won her the Noma Children's Literature Newcomer Award. Many of her stories have cats as characters or describe relationships between cats and humans, or draw upon childhood memories. Another recurring theme is the way people's cruel behaviour affects the lives of others.

Yoshiyuki died in Tokyo on 4 May 2006 of thyroid cancer.

Her older brother Junnosuke was also a novelist, and her older sister Kazuko is an actress.

Selected works
 1963: Aoi Heya (poetry collection)
 1967: Yume no naka de (poetry collection)
 1971: Mahōtsukai no kushan neko
 1972: Kumo no iru sora
 1973: Kioku no naka ni
 1973: Senaka no neko
 1975: Otoko girai (short story collection)
 1981: The Little Lady (short story collection)
 1981: Ido no hoshi (short story collection)
 1982: Meiro no futago
 1983: Tooka no tsubomi
 1983: Haioku no hime-gimi
 1987: Hana kagami
 1988: Kiiroi neko (short story collection)

Translations
Only few of Yoshiyuki's writings have been translated into English, these include her poems Carrying and Sacrificial Victim, and the short story The Little Lady. Her short story  was translated into German as Im Brunnen die Sterne.

Awards
 1967: Tamura Toshiko Prize for Yume no naka de
 1970: 9th Noma Children's Literature Newcomer Award for Mahōtsukai no kushan neko
 1981: 85th Akutagawa Prize for The Little Lady
 1989: 28th Women's Literature Prize for Kiiroi neko

References

1939 births
2006 deaths
20th-century Japanese novelists
20th-century Japanese poets
Japanese women novelists
Japanese women poets
Waseda University alumni
Akutagawa Prize winners
20th-century women writers